HMS TB 12 (originally named HMS Moth) was a Cricket-class coastal destroyer or torpedo-boat of the British Royal Navy. TB 12 was built by the shipbuilder Yarrow from 1905 to 1907. She was used for local patrol duties in the First World War and was sunk by a German mine in the North Sea on 10 June 1915.

Design
The Cricket-class was intended as a smaller and cheaper supplement to the large, fast but expensive Tribal-class, particularly in coastal waters such as the English Channel. An initial order for twelve ships was placed by the Admiralty in May 1905 as part of the 1905–1906 shipbuilding programme, with five ships each ordered from Thornycroft and J. Samuel White and two from Yarrow .

The ships had turtleback forecastles and two funnels. Two oil-fuelled Yarrow water-tube boilers fed steam to three-stage Parsons steam turbines, driving three propeller shafts. The machinery was designed to give , with a speed of  specified.

Armament consisted of two 12-pounder (76-mm) 12 cwt guns and three 18-inch (450 mm) torpedo tubes (in three single mounts). The ships had a crew of 39.

Service
Both of Yarrow's two torpedo-boats of the 1905–1906 programme, Mayfly and Moth were laid down at their Poplar, London shipyard on 23 November 1905.  In 1906, the ships of the class, including Moth, were redesignated as torpedo-boats, losing their names in the process, with Moth becoming TB 12. She was launched on 15 March 1907 and was completed in July 1907.

In early 1911 TB 12, previously employed at the Dartmouth Naval College, joined the Nore Flotilla. She was refitted at Sheerness in 1911.

On 9 June 1915, following the sinking by a German submarine (probably U-10) of six fishing smacks, the Nore Local Defence Flotilla launched a large search for the submarine involved, with five destroyers and six torpedo-boats, including TB 12, taking part. At 03:30 on 10 June TB 12 was about 2 miles north east of the Sunk Light Vessel when an explosion wrecked the fore part of the ship. Her sister ship  took TB 12 in tow, but shortly afterwards an explosion wrecked TB 10 which broke in two and quickly sank. Attempts to save TB 12 failed and she sank at 10:55. Although it was believed at the time that the ships had been torpedoed, with the destroyer  reporting that she had seen a torpedo heading towards TB 10 and that Vulture herself had been near-missed by another torpedo, the two torpedo-boats had actually been sunk by mines. 23 of TB 12s crew were killed.

Notes

References

Torpedo boats of the Royal Navy
Ships built in Poplar
1907 ships